The 1991 Porsche Tennis Grand Prix was a women's tennis tournament played on indoor hard courts at the Filderstadt Tennis Centre in Filderstadt, Germany and was part of the Tier II of the 1991 WTA Tour. It was the 14th edition of the tournament and was held from 14 October to 20 October 1991. Unseeded Anke Huber won the singles title and earned $70,000 first-prize money.

Finals

Singles
 Anke Huber defeated  Martina Navratilova 2–6, 6–2, 7–6(7–4)
 It was Huber's 1st singles title of the year and the 2nd of her career.

Doubles
 Martina Navratilova /  Jana Novotná defeated  Pam Shriver /  Natasha Zvereva 6–2, 5–7, 6–4

Prize money and ranking points

References

External links
 Official website 
 ITF tournament edition details
 Tournament draws

Porsche Tennis Grand Prix
Porsche Tennis Grand Prix
Porsche Tennis Grand Prix
1990s in Baden-Württemberg
Porsche Tennis Grand Prix
Porsch